Yoshida Dam is a rockfill dam located in Fukuoka Prefecture in Japan. The dam is used for water supply. The catchment area of the dam is 0.6 km2. The dam impounds about 13  ha of land when full and can store 877 thousand cubic meters of water. The construction of the dam was started on 1977 and completed in 1983.

References

Dams in Fukuoka Prefecture
1983 establishments in Japan